Thomas Charles Cossitt (November 15, 1927 – March 15, 1982) was a Canadian politician.

Born in Brockville, Ontario, the son of Edwin Comstock Cossitt and Marjorie Helen Delahaye, he graduated from St. Andrew's College and received a Bachelor of Arts degree from the University of Toronto. After graduating, he was the owner and president of an insurance company. He was president of the Eastern Ontario Liberal Federation and a vice-president of the Ontario Liberal Party. However, he switched to the Progressive Conservatives before being elected to the House of Commons of Canada in the 1972 election in the riding of Leeds. He was re-elected in 1974, 1979, and 1980, the last two elections in the riding of Leeds—Grenville.

Cossitt's positions on bilingualism were a topic of discussion during the 1972 and 1974 elections. During the 1972 election, he took out newspaper advertisements with the tagline "I'm not anti-French, but...". In the 1974 election, he was quoted in the Montreal Gazette as saying "Instant bilingualism is not only stupid and arrogant, it's just plain nuts". Cossitt stressed that while he supported both official languages, it was necessary to consider the financial burden of the Trudeau government's new policies.
 
Cossitt, who had two previous heart attacks, died of a heart attack during a photo session at the annual directors' meeting of the Leeds-Grenville Progressive Conservative Riding Association in 1982. His second wife, Jennifer Cossitt (née Birchall) was elected in the resulting by-election and re-elected in the 1984 election before being defeated in the 1988 election.

References

External links
 

1927 births
1982 deaths
Members of the House of Commons of Canada from Ontario
Progressive Conservative Party of Canada MPs
University of Toronto alumni
St. Andrew's College (Aurora) alumni
People from Brockville